Zsuzsanna Heiner could refer to: